Ding Yi (born October 1959) is a naval aviator and vice admiral of the Chinese People's Liberation Army Navy (PLAN). He has served as Deputy Commander of the PLAN since 2013.

Biography
Ding was born in October 1959 in Leiyang, Hunan Province. He began his military career as a naval aviator, and served as commander of an aviation division in the East Sea Fleet, deputy chief of staff the North Sea Fleet, and deputy commander and then commander of the PLA Naval Air Force. In 2013, he was promoted to deputy commander of the PLA Navy. He attained the rank of vice admiral (zhong jiang) on 10 July 2014.

References

1959 births
Living people
People from Leiyang
People's Liberation Army generals from Hunan
People's Liberation Army Navy admirals
Chinese naval aviators